Gordon McMullan (born 1934) is an Anglican bishop and author.

Born in 1934  and educated at Queen's University Belfast, he was ordained in 1963. After  curacies at  Ballymacarrett and Knock he became Central Adviser on Christian Stewardship to  the Church of Ireland. Later he was Rector of St Brendan's, East Belfast, and then Incumbent of St. Columba, Knock (Down) 1976–80. Archdeacon of Down. From 1980 to 1986 he was Bishop of Clogher; and from then to 1997, Bishop of Down and Dromore. McMullan was elected to Down and Dromore in 1986 and resigned in January 1997.

References

1934 births
Alumni of Queen's University Belfast
Archdeacons of Down
20th-century Anglican bishops in Ireland
Bishops of Down and Dromore
Bishops of Clogher (Church of Ireland)
Living people